Crystal Lakes may refer to:

 Crystal Lakes, Missouri, United States
 Crystal Lakes, New Jersey, United States
 Crystal Lakes, Ohio, United States

See also
 Crystal Lake (disambiguation)